MG2 may refer to: 

MG2 (company), an architecture firm based in Seattle, Washington, United States
Metal Gear 2: Solid Snake, video game
Rheinmetall MG3
MG2 electric motor, Motor Generator No. 2 in Toyota Hybrid System
Mg2+, magnesium
A General Motors RPO code for the Getrag 282 transmission
 Meteor Garden II
 Moto G (2014 version), a smartphone made by Motorola

See also 
 MG1 (disambiguation)